Parrotiopsis is a genus of deciduous shrub or small tree in the witch hazel family.

Species 
 Parrotiopsis involucrata (Falc. ex Nied.) C.K.Schneid.
 Parrotiopsis jacquemontiana (Decne.) Rehder

References 

 The Plant List entry

 
Saxifragales genera